The genus Hydrochoerus contains two living and three extinct species of rodents from South America, the Caribbean island of Grenada, California and Panama. Capybaras are the largest living rodents in the world. The genus name is derived from the Greek ὕδωρ (hýdor, water) plus χοίρος (choíros, pig).

Characteristics 
Capybaras are semiaquatic, found in and near lakes, rivers, swamps, and flooded savanna. Their diets are dominated by grasses. The gestation period is 130–150 days, with two to eight (most commonly four) young born to females.

Behavior 
Capybaras are highly social, living in groups of up to 100 and communicating through a variety of vocalizations. Breeding is polygynous, with males forming harems.

Phylogeny and taxonomy 
Molecular results have consistently suggested Hydrochoerus is most closely related to Kerodon (the rock cavies), and the two evolved from within the Caviidae. This led Woods and Kilpatrick to unite the two into the subfamily Hydrochoerinae within the Caviidae.  Based on use of a molecular clock approach, Hydrochoerus appears to have diverged from Kerodon in the late Middle Miocene (about 12 million years ago).

The extinct North American species formerly recognized as Hydrochoerus holmesi is now assigned to Neochoerus.

Species

Extant Species

Fossils
 † Hydrochoerus ballesterensis – Pliocene capybara endemic to Argentina
 † Hydrochoerus gaylordi – Plio-Pleistocene capybara endemic to the Caribbean island of Grenada
 † Hydrochoerus hesperotiganites – Late Pleistocene capybara endemic to North America (San Diegeo County, California)

Distribution 
Presently, capybaras live in northern South America and adjacent southern Central America (lesser capybara) and in the tropical to subtropical regions of South America (capybara). The fossil species inhabited Buenos Aires Province in Argentina (H. ballesterensis) and the Caribbean island of Grenada (H. gaylordi). One species, H. hesperotiganites even ranged as far north as California. Fauna found at the same site included the South American tapir (Tapirus terrestris), Cryptotis sp., collared peccary (Tayassu tajacu), white-lipped peccary (Tayassu pecari), and Mazama sp.

References

Bibliography

Further reading 
 

Cavies
Rodent genera
Mammals of Central America
Mammals of South America
Pleistocene mammals of South America
Pliocene mammals of South America
Neogene Argentina
Fossils of Argentina
Neogene Colombia
Fossils of Colombia
Mammals described in 1762
Taxa named by Mathurin Jacques Brisson
Semiaquatic mammals